Eresfjord og Vistdal is a former municipality in Møre og Romsdal county, Norway. It existed from 1890 until its dissolution in 1964. The  municipality encompassed all of the present-day Molde Municipality that lies south of the Langfjorden and surrounding the Eresfjorden. The administrative centre of the municipality was the village of Eresfjord. The municipality included the two parishes of Vistdal and Eresfjord and there were two churches in the municipality: Sira Church in Eresfjord and Vistdal Church in Myklebostad.

History
The municipality of Eresfjord og Vistdal was established on 1 January 1890 when it was split off from Nesset Municipality. Eresfjord og Vistdal had an initial population of 2,155. During the 1960s, there were many municipal mergers across Norway due to the work of the Schei Committee. On 1 January 1964, the municipality was reunited with Nesset Municipality.  Prior to the merger, Eresfjord og Vistdal had a population of 1,289.

Government
All municipalities in Norway, including Eresfjord og Vistdal, are responsible for primary education (through 10th grade), outpatient health services, senior citizen services, unemployment and other social services, zoning, economic development, and municipal roads.  The municipality is governed by a municipal council of elected representatives, which in turn elects a mayor.

Municipal council
The municipal council  of Eresfjord og Vistdal was made up of 17 representatives that were elected to four year terms.  The party breakdown of the final municipal council was as follows:

See also
List of former municipalities of Norway

References

Molde
Former municipalities of Norway
1890 establishments in Norway
1964 disestablishments in Norway